Khagendra Thapa Magar (4 October 1992 – 17 January 2020) was a Nepali once known as the shortest man in the world, measuring . Magar, who was a primordial dwarf, won the title of shortest man from Edward Niño Hernández. He lost the title in June 2011 to Junrey Balawing of the Philippines.

Biography
Born on 18 Asoj in the Nepali calendar, or 4 October 1992, he was from the Baglung District of Nepal. In May 2008, Khagendra appeared in the British Channel 4 documentary called The World's Smallest Man and Me hosted by Mark Dolan.

Magar died in a Pokhara hospital on 17 January 2020 after complications from pneumonia at the age of 27.

See also 
List of the verified shortest people
List of people with dwarfism
List of world records from Nepal
Malati Rishidev - Shortest woman in Nepal

References

External links

 "In pictures: New world's shortest man". BBC photo article, 14 October 2010
 "Nepal Boy Claims to Be Shortest in World". Associated Press/AP Online, 30 August 2006

1992 births
2020 deaths
People from Baglung District
People with dwarfism
Nepalese people with disabilities